The 2023 Open Saint-Brieuc was a professional tennis tournament played on hard courts. It was the 18th edition of the tournament which was part of the 2023 ATP Challenger Tour. It took place in Saint-Brieuc, France between 20 and 26 March 2023.

Singles main-draw entrants

Seeds

 Rankings are as of 13 March 2023.

Other entrants
The following players received wildcards into the singles main draw:
  Antoine Ghibaudo
  Sascha Gueymard Wayenburg
  Pierre-Hugues Herbert

The following players received entry into the singles main draw as alternates:
  Clément Chidekh
  Calvin Hemery
  Giovanni Oradini

The following players received entry from the qualifying draw:
  Constantin Bittoun Kouzmine
  Mathias Bourgue
  Jurgen Briand
  Mark Lajal
  Lucas Poullain
  Alexandre Reco

Champions

Singles

 vs.

Doubles

 /  vs.  /

References

2023 ATP Challenger Tour
2023
2023 in French tennis
March 2023 sports events in France